Arakonak is a town (belde) in Solhan District, Bingöl Province, Turkey. The town is populated by Kurds of the Xilan tribe and had a population of 2,601 in 2021.

The town is divided into the neighborhoods of Karşıyaka, Kültür and Merkez.

References

Towns in Turkey
Populated places in Bingöl Province
Kurdish settlements in Bingöl Province
Solhan District